Volata ("flow") is a code of football developed and promoted by Italian fascists for a brief period during the late 1920s and early 1930s, in an attempt to displace sports with non-Italian origins, such as association football (soccer) and rugby union.

Association football was popular in Italy when the fascists came to power in 1921. Rugby union was a new and relatively minor sport, but also growing in popularity.

Although the fascists idealized association football for its contribution to physical fitness, it was also seen at the time as an "English game" (because the rules had been codified by the English Football Association and the first organized matches had taken place in England). The fascists generally  distanced themselves from cultural practices with foreign roots.

Conversely, rugby was seen as a modern interpretation of the extinct Ancient Roman game of harpastum. By 1927, fascist propaganda actively promoted rugby, which it referred to as palla ovale ("oval ball"). However, the Federazione Italiana Rugby proved resistant to manipulation and the fascists quickly ceased their support.

The national secretary of the Fascist Party, Augusto Turati, devised volata. Officially, the rules were based on long-extinct codes of football indigenous to Italy, especially the Roman harpastum and the medieval calcio Fiorentino. Volata was contested by eight-member sides, with rules that were described by a 1929 propaganda newsreel from Istituto Luce as a "synthesis of the essential elements of the games of calcio and rugby" (sintesi di elementi essenziali del giuoco del calcio e del "rugby"). Use of the word "calcio" was ambiguous, as it was the usual name of association football, as well as calcio Fiorentino, which in 1930 was also revived at the fascists' behest.

Promoted by Fascist sporting and cultural organizations, Volata enjoyed a brief phase of popularity. More than 100 Volata clubs and a league were reportedly formed. However, the enduring popularity of association football caused the fascists to change their attitude toward the sport.

In 1933, volata organizations and competitions were officially abandoned. Afterwards the fascists encouraged association football; Italy hosted and won the 1934 World Cup.

The popularity of rugby and its place within Italian sporting culture appear to have been reduced by the changing policies of the fascists, as well as the invention of volata. Nevertheless, rugby survived the fascist period and began to grow when Italy was occupied by British Commonwealth forces during 1943–47.

See also
Harpastum
Calcio Fiorentino
History of association football in Italy
History of rugby in Italy

References

 Making the Rugby World: Race, Gender, Commerce edited by Timothy J L Chandler and John Nauright. See especially pages 92–94. Book page:  
 National Pastime: How Americans Play Baseball and the Rest of the World Plays Soccer by Stefan Szymanski, Andrew S Zimbalist Book Page: 

Team sports
Ball games
Association football variants
Sports originating in Italy
Italian Fascism
Hybrid sports